Viktoriya Rybovalova (born 8 April 1986) is a Ukrainian shooter, who competes in running target competitions.

External links

1986 births
Living people
Sportspeople from Kryvyi Rih
Ukrainian female sport shooters
Running target shooters
21st-century Ukrainian women